Maximilian Emanuel of Württemberg-Winnental (February 27, 1689 in Stuttgart – September 25, 1709 in Dubno), son of Frederick Charles of Württemberg-Winnental and Margravine Eleonore Juliane of Brandenburg-Ansbach, was a volunteer in the army of Charles XII of Sweden and a devoted friend to the king.

In 1703, at age 14 he joined Charles XII's Polish campaign before the Battle of Pułtusk, and was since known throughout the army as the Little Prince.

On June 18, 1708 he was wounded by the River Berezina while attempting to shield the king from bullets, but recovered in time to fight in the Battle of Holowczyn. He was later made colonel of the Buchwald's Dragoons.

In the Battle of Poltava he was captured by the Russians. Released shortly after, he died on the way home at Dubno in Volhynia. King Charles long mourned the loss of his "best and truest friend".

His heart was buried at St. Gumbertus Church in Ansbach.

Ancestors 

1689 births
1709 deaths
House of Württemberg
Caroleans
Sons of monarchs